The Battle of Gettysburg was a battle in the American Civil War.  It can also refer to:

 The Battle of Gettysburg (1913 film), a 1913 lost film, directed by Thomas H. Ince
 The Battle of Gettysburg (1955 film), a 1955 short documentary film, that was nominated for two Academy Awards
 Gettysburg (1993 film)
 Gettysburg Cyclorama, a nineteenth-century cyclorama painting by Paul Philippoteaux